Giacinto Brandi (1621 – 19 January 1691) was an Italian painter from the Baroque era, active mainly in Rome and Naples.

Biography
Born in Rome, he was part of the studio of Alessandro Algardi, a noted sculptor who noted that Brandi was more suited to painting. He joined the studio of Giovanni Giacomo Sementi. He traveled to Naples from 1638, and by 1647 had returned to Rome to work under Giovanni Lanfranco, where Brandi befriended Mattia Preti. The two artists would later on, often collaborate.

His works are well distributed among baroque Churches of Rome including San Carlo al Corso ceiling frescoes (1670–1671), San Silvestro in Capite, Sant'Andrea al Quirinale, a canvas of Sant'Andrea (1650) in Santa Maria in Via Lata, a painting of Martyrdom of the Forty (1660) for the Chiesa delle Santissima Stimmate di San Francesco, a Coronation of the Virgin (1680) which serves as main altarpiece for the church of Gesù e Maria, a canvas of the Drunkedness of Noah in the Galleria Corsini, an Assumption (1655) for Santa Maria in Organo in Verona, a fresco from Ovid's Metamorphoses (1651–1653) for Palazzo Pamphilj in Piazza Navona, and a Martyrdom of San Biagio for the church of San Carlo ai Catinari; a Visione del beato Giovanni di San Facondo (1656) and a Estasi della beata Rita da Cascia (1660) in the Basilica di Sant'Agostino in Campo Marzio, San Rocco intercede per i malati di peste (1673) and San Rocco in gloria (1674) in the Chiesa di San Rocco all'Augusteo; Compianto sul Cristo morto (1675–76) in the Chiesa di Sant'Andrea al Quirinale.
In 1647, he joined the Congregazione dei Virtuosi al Pantheon in Rome and from 1651 was inducted into the Accademia di San Luca for painters. In 1663, he frescoed the life of Saint Erasmus for the crypt of the cathedral of Gaeta. Some of his works are in Milan, Toledo, and Zaragoza.

Among his pupils were Carlo Lamparelli of Spello, and
Alessandro Vassello.

References 
 Grove encyclopedia entry on Artnet
 Web Gallery of Art biography

1621 births
1691 deaths
People from the Metropolitan City of Rome Capital
17th-century Italian painters
Italian male painters
Painters from Naples
Italian Baroque painters